The constitutions of France  are the various foundational texts that have organized the institutions of France at different periods of its history. These may be known under various names  – constitution, charter, constitutional laws or acts – and take precedence over other legislative texts.

The constitutional text currently in force in France is the constitution of 1958, which founded the Fifth Republic. It was approved by the people in a referendum on September 28, 1958, and officially promulgated on October 4 of the same year.

History 

Precursors 

The Kingdom of France, under the Ancien Régime, was an absolute monarchy and lacked a formal constitution; the regime essentially relied on custom. That said, certain rules known as the fundamental laws of the Kingdom were outside the power of the monarch to change without further consent. These rules were mainly about the inheritance of the Crown, which required strict primogeniture unless the heir was not Catholic, and from the Treaty of Troyes onward was strictly agnatic (male-only) as well. The Parlement of Paris, a primarily judicial body with quasi-legislative functions that was tasked with applying the fundamental laws, rarely brooked modification of the laws. For instance, Louis XIV tried by his will and testament to change the inheritance order, but the Parlement annulled it. On the other hand, the law was occasionally changed, as when the provisions of the Peace of Utrecht renouncing the claim of Louis XIV's grandson Philippe to inherit the throne of France were approved to allow him to inherit the throne of Spain.

List of constitutions 

The Revolutionary Era saw a number of constitutions:
 Constitution of 1791, which established a parliamentary monarchy (3 September 1791).
 Constitution of 1793 (French Republican calendar), which was never implemented (21 June 1793).
 Constitution of the Year III, which instituted the Directory (5 Fructidor of Year III = 28 July 1795).
 Constitution of the Year VIII, which instituted the Consulate (22 Fructidor of the Year VIII = 13 December 1799).
 French Constitution of Year X, still during the Consulate (16 Thermidor of Year X = 2 August 1802).
 Constitution of the Year XII, which instituted the First Empire (28 Floréal of the year XII = 18 May 1804).
Following the restoration of the monarchy:
 Charter of 1814 of 4 June 1814 established the Bourbon Restoration.
 Charter of 1815 of 22 April 1815 (Hundred Days).
 Charter of 1830 of 14 August 1830 established the July Monarchy.
Mid-19th century:
 Constitution of 1848 adopted 4 November 1848, established the Second Republic.
 Constitution of 1852 adopted 14 January 1852, established the Second Empire.
 Constitutional Laws of 1875 of the Third Republic, 24 and 25 February, and 16 July 1875.
20th century:
 Constitutional Law of 1940 adopted 10 July 1940, established Vichy France.
 Constitutional law of 2 November 1945, organized the Provisional Government of the French Republic.
 Constitution of 27 October 1946, established the Fourth Republic.
 Constitution of 4 October 1958, established the Fifth Republic.

Preamble 

In France, the preamble to the constitution of the Fifth Republic of 1958 was considered ancillary and therefore non-binding until a major jurisprudential reversal by the Constitutional Council in a decision of 16 July 1971. This decision, which began with the words "Having regard to the constitution and its preamble," affected a considerable change of French constitutional law, as the preamble and the texts it referred to, the Declaration of the Rights of Man and of the Citizen of 1789 and the preamble to the constitution of the Fourth Republic, took their place alongside the constitution proper as texts understood as being invested with constitutional value.

Timeline diagram

See also 

 Article 49 of the French Constitution
 Constitutionalism
 French Constitutional Council
 Constitutional economics
 Fifth Republic (France)
 Political system of France
 Politics of France
 Parliamentary immunity in France
 De Gaulle's 1946 Bayeux speech

References 

Notes

Footnotes

Further reading

External links 

Constitutions of France
Legal history of France
France
Government of France
Political charters
Popular sovereignty